August 17, 2016 Van attack, a bomb attack on the Iki Nisan police headquarters in Van city center on 17 August 2016.

Attack
A car bomb was detonated near the building by a PKK member at 23:15 in front of the Iki Nisan Police Station on Sıhke Street in the central İpekyolu District of Van. A total of 4 people, 2 of whom were police officers, lost their lives in the attack, and 72 people, 20 of whom were police officers, were injured. The surrounding buildings were also damaged in the attack.

References

2016 in Turkey
Kurdish–Turkish conflict (2015–present)
Kurdistan Workers' Party attacks
Mass murder in 2016
Terrorist incidents in Turkey